Devils Ridge is a rocky, sickle-shaped ridge extending from the south end of The Flatiron and forming the north wall of New Glacier, close west of Granite Harbour in Victoria Land. It was charted and named by the British Antarctic Expedition, 1910–13, under Robert Falcon Scott.

References 

Ridges of Victoria Land
Scott Coast